Events in the year 1647 in Norway.

Incumbents
Monarch: Christian IV

Events
 17 January - Postvesenet is established.

Arts and literature

Births

Full date unknown
Petter Dass, poet (died 1707).

Deaths

See also

References

 
Denmark
Denmark